Adam Richard Steigert (born December 31, 1986) is an American filmmaker, featured in books, newspapers, magazines, podcasts, and various interviews. He is known for his films OMBIS Alien Invasion, A Grim Becoming, Fang and The Horrific Evil Monsters. He co-founded the Buffalo-based production company 388 Studios in 2018.

Life and career
An American filmmaker, featured in books, newspaper, magazines, podcasts, and various interviews. Steigert was born in Hamburg, New York on December 31, 1986. His parents were Warren Richard Steigert and Jean M. Sanders, and he was raised by his grandparents, William and Kathleen Sanders. He formed the production company DefTone Pictures Studios with Stephanie Wlosinski, writing and directing the 2008 film Bitez and the 2009 film Gore. His most popular film involves zombies in the cult classic Prisoners of the Dead. This film would later go on to prove a staple in his filmmaking career. He later wrote, directed, and produced the short grindhouse films  Homicidal Vengeance. In 2013, Steigert wrote and directed the science fiction film Ombis: Alien Invasion, which was later re-titled in Best Buy, Walmart and Netflix as Not Human.

In 2014, Steigert directed, co-wrote, and co-edited the comedy horror film A Grim Becoming. Steigert then directed, co-wrote, and produced the 2017 film STAR [Space Traveling Alien Reject]. His next project, a werewolf-based horror film titled Fang, released in 2018. Advancing the story to the next level, Steigert embarked on his most ambitious film project, a super horror team up known as The Horrific Evil Monster.

After the successes of The Horrific Evil Monsters, Director Adam Steigert under the direction of 388 Studios, Produced and Directed a spin-off series focusing on the Grim Reapers 9 to 5, entitled A Grim Mini Series: Final Fracture. Later, Steigert claimed this series was his favorite incarnation of the Grim Reaper. 

In 2021 Steigert began writing a sequel to his most notable film OMBIS Alien Awakening, which he has promises will be a true sequel to the original. Adam is in early talks to be a producer on an in-development bio-pic that will focus on his filmmaking career and writing a book on filmmaking.

Selected filmography

As director
 Bitez (2008)
 Gore (2009)
 Pigman vs. Gore (short) (201)
 Prisoners of the Dead (2011)
 Ombis Alien Invasion (2013)
 To Release a Soul (short) (2013)
 Caged (short) (2013)
 A Grim Becoming (2014)
 The Making of A Grim Becoming (short) (2014)
 STAR (Space Traveling Alien Reject) (2017)
 Fang (2018)
 Homicidal Vengeance (2020)
 "The Horrific Evil Monsters" (2021)
 "A Grim Mini Series: Final Fracture" (2022)
 "[[A Grim Mini Series: Final Fracture <<<Rewind]]" (2022)

As producer
 Bitez (2008)
 Gore (2009)
 Pigman vs. Gore (short) (201)
 Prisoners of the Dead (2011)
 OMBIS Alien Invasion (2013)
 To Release a Soul (short) (2013)
 Caged (short) (2013)
 A Grim Becoming (2014)
 The Making of A Grim Becoming (short) (2014)
 STAR (Space Traveling Alien Reject) (2017)
 Fang (2018)
 Homicidal Vengeance (2020)
 "The Horrific Evil Monsters" (2021)
 "A Grim Mini Series: Final Fracture" (2022)
 "[[A Grim Mini Series: Final Fracture <<<Rewind]]" (2022)

References

External links
 
 

1986 births
Living people
American filmmakers
Film producers from New York (state)
American male film actors
Screenwriters from New York (state)
Horror film directors
People from Hamburg, New York